ETMA Turmeric Complex or Erode Turmeric Merchants Association Turmeric Market is one of the four dedicated market places for turmeric in Erode, Tamil Nadu. Also called as Semmampalayam Turmeric Complex by the name of its location in Erode, Tamil Nadu. Erode is the second largest turmeric market in India, only behind Nizamabad. Erode Turmeric is a type of turmeric in spices category which has been given Geographical indication.

History
The market was originally functioning in the core city area near Clock tower in an unorganized manner. Considering the space shortage and traffic congestion, it has been shifted to the new sprawling area spreading over 52 acres along the Nasiyanur Road in Erode. The original plan of shifting was to integrate all the four turmeric markets in the city and make it as an Integrated Turmeric Complex.  But owing to some controversies, all the other three markets were still functioning separately.

Operation
The Market Complex is owned and maintained by the Erode Turmeric Merchants and Godown Owners Association, while the marketing and sale auctions were monitored and controlled by Erode Market Committee's Regulated Market. Erode Regulated Market has their Auction yard and branch office functioning inside the complex. It also has an extension counter of a Nationalized Bank. The market functions daily with Auction sales.This regulated market is being operated by President of ETMA Mr. Ravishankar,Vice President of ETMA Mr. Ramachandran, Secretary of ETMA Mr. Sakthivel, Treasurer of ETMA Mr. Mavivanan and Executive member of ETMA Mr. Karthikeyan and other office bearers

Apart from this, the other three Turmeric Markets functioning in Erode are 
 Erode Market Committee's Perundurai Regulated Market - EMC Perundurai Turmeric Market Complex at Karumandisellipalayam
 Erode Agricultural Producers Cooperative Marketing Society's EAPCMS Turmeric Market Complex  at Karungalpalayam
 Gobichettipalayam Agricultural Producers Cooperative Marketing Society's Erode GAPCMS Turmeric Market near Clock Tower, Erode

See Also
 Erode Turmeric
 Abdul Gani Textile Market

References

Economy of Erode
Agriculture in Tamil Nadu
Wholesale markets in India
Agricultural marketing in India